Vigan, officially the City of Vigan, is a 4th class component city and capital of the province of Ilocos Sur, Philippines. According to the 2020 census, it has a population of 53,935 people.

Located on the western coast of the large island of Luzon, facing the South China Sea, it is a UNESCO World Heritage Site and it is one of the few Spanish colonial towns left in the Philippines whose old structures have mostly remained intact. It is well known for its sett pavements and a unique architecture of the Spanish Philippines  colonial era which fuses Native Philippine and Oriental building designs and construction, with colonial Spanish architecture that is still abundant in the area, mainly the Bahay na Bato houses and an Earthquake Baroque church. Former Philippine president Elpidio Quirino, the sixth President of the Philippines, was born in Vigan, at the former location of the Provincial Jail (his father was a warden). He also resided in the Syquia Mansion, which is a wedding gift of his in-laws to his wife. The entire city of Vigan was later inscribed as a UNESCO World Heritage City after being declared as a UNESCO World Heritage Site. It is a member of the Organization of World Heritage Cities (OWHC).

In May 2015, Vigan City was officially recognized as one of the New7Wonders Cities together with Beirut, Doha, Durban, Havana, Kuala Lumpur and La Paz. New7Wonders Foundation president and founding member Bernard Weber led a ceremony held at St. Paul Cathedral where he handed a bronze plaque to former Vigan Mayor Eva Grace Singson-Medina, signifying the heritage city's election as one of the world's wonder cities.

Etymology
The area of Vigan was originally a settlement of traders coming from the Fujian Province, China. At the time of Spanish colonisation, the Chinese settlers, whose language was Southern Min (Min Nan, often referred to as "Hokkien" by most Filipinos), referred to the area as Bee Gan, which means "Beautiful Shore." Since the Spanish conquistadors interchanged V and the B to refer to the /b/ sound, they spelled the Hokkien Chinese name "Bee Gan" as Vigan, which is the name used to this day.

Vigan's Chinese heritage is still evident from the numerous elite Chinese creole families who come from the area, many of whom adopted Hispanic family names. Others, such as the Syquia family, have retained Chinese-derived surnames, though most, if not all, of the Christian Chinese creole families fully Hispanicised themselves culturally.

The most commonly known source of the city's name is from the Biga'a plant, which once grew abundantly along the banks of the Mestizo River, from which captain Juan de Salcedo derived the city's name (after a misunderstanding with the locals, thinking he was asking the name of the plants).

Other names
The city's full name at the time of its Spanish foundation was Villa Fernandina, or "Town of Ferdinand", in honor of Prince Ferdinand, the firstborn son of King Philip II of Spain. As the city grew, and the seat of the Archdiocese of Nueva Segovia transferred to Vigan, it was later renamed Ciudad Fernandina de Vigan ("Ferdinand's City of Vigan/Fernandine City of Vigan").

History

Due to silting of the Mestizo River, Vigan City is no longer separated from the mainland, therefore no longer an island. The city is unique in the Philippines because it is one of many extensive surviving Philippine historic cities, dating back to the 16th century.

Vigan was a coastal trading post long before the Spaniards arrived; Chinese traders sailing from the South China Sea came to Isla de Vigan (Island of Vigan) via the Mestizo River that surrounded it. On board their ships were seafaring merchants who came to trade goods from other Asian kingdoms in exchange for gold, beeswax, and other mountain products brought by the indigenous peoples from the Cordillera region.

In the book The Philippine Island (Vol. III, p. 276, Blair and Robertson) two letters from Governor-General Guido de Lavezaris to King Philip II of Spain mention: "It seemed best to send Captain Juan de Salcedo with 70 or 80 soldiers to explore the coast of Los Ilocanos on the shores of the river called Bigan." The Spaniards led by Salcedo marched north from Manila on May 20, 1572. They arrived in Vigan on June 13, 1572.

Thus, after the successful expedition and the exploration of the North, Juan de Salcedo founded "Villa Fernandina de Vigan" in honor of King Philip II's son, Prince Ferdinand, who died at the age of four. From Vigan, Salcedo rounded the tip of Luzón and proceeded to pacify Camarines, Albay, and Catanduanes. As a reward for his services to the King of Spain, Salcedo was awarded the old province of Ilocos, which consisted of the modern provinces of Ilocos Norte, Ilocos Sur, Abra, La Union and part of Mountain Province as his hacienda (estate), and was accorded the title of Justicia Mayor de esta Provincia de Ylocos (Province Mayor of Ilocos).

In 1574, Salcedo returned to the capital of his encomienda (trusteeship), Vigan, bringing with him his soldiers and some Augustinian missionaries to pioneer the evangelization of the Ilocos region. He established a Spanish city for the purpose of controlling the neighboring country.

Governor General Gómez Pérez Dasmariñas, in his account of encomienda dated in Manila on May 31, 1591, states: "The town of Vigan called Villa Fernandina consisted of Spanish settlers; a priest; a Justice Alcalde Mayor (Governor); and a Deputy. The King collects 800 tributes (equivalent to 3,200 subjects)." During this period, Vigan was composed of 19 barrios (districts).

Between 1645 and 1660, Vigan was divided into 21 Cabezas de Barrio (Town Mayors) as mentioned in the Libro de Casamiento (Book of Marriage); from the records of the parish house of Vigan found in its archives. Separated from the indigenous population, the Chinese migrants were residents in a neighbourhood called El Pariancillo, los Sangleyes del parian (The Sangleyes of the Parian); and the Spanish settlers were residents in a town called Los Españoles de la Villa (The Town Spaniards).

During the Philippine Revolution, revolutionary forces under Manuel Tinio, supported by the Ilocano rebels, attacked and defeated the Spanish colonial forces and captured the city in the Siege of Vigan. During the Philippine–American War, American forces led by Commander McCracken and Lt. Col. James Parker occupied the town in Nov. 1899.

At the start of World War II, Vigan was one of the first places in the Philippines invaded by Japan on December 10, 1941. In 1945, combined U.S. and Philippine Commonwealth ground troops, aided by Ilocano resistance fighters, defeated the Japanese Imperial forces and liberated Vigan.

In 1999, Vigan was listed by UNESCO as the best preserved example of Spanish colonial towns in Asia. Its architecture is the conglomeration of cultural elements from the Philippines, China, and Spain, making it unique in the world.

Recent history

Cityhood 

On December 27, 2000, then President Joseph Estrada signed Republic Act No. 8988, that "revalidated and recognized" Vigan's city status granted by virtue of the Royal Decree of September 7, 1757, issued by Ferdinand VI, King of Spain. This legislation serves as Vigan's present city charter. The charter did not provide a clause for a plebiscite and the law took effect in January 2001.

New7Wonders 
On December 7, 2014, Vigan was named as one of the New7Wonders Cities.

2022 Luzon earthquake 

On July 27, 2022, a 7.0 magnitude earthquake struck parts of Luzon, damaging the city's UNESCO World Heritage sites including the Vigan Cathedral and old-century houses, as well as few power lines toppled along Calle Crisologo.

Geography

Vigan is situated in the northern part of Luzon, the Philippines’ largest island. It serves as the capital of Ilocos Sur and has been a major political and trading center since before the Spanish colonizers arrived in the Philippines.

Topography
Its  of land consists mostly of plains with gentle hills. Its boundaries on the north, east, south, and west are the municipalities of Bantay, Santa, Caoayan, and Santa Catalina, respectively. The South China Sea is on its southwest portion.

Majority of its land, 60 percent of it, is used for agriculture. Around 32 percent is made up of residential area, nearly three percent are for commercial and industrial use, and around one percent is for institutional purposes. There are also forest reserves and fishponds included in Vigan's land area.

Vigan is made up of 39 barangays. Thirty of them are classified as rural, but they occupy only 2,366 hectares. The remaining nine are classified as poblacion barangays and are together 144.75 hectares big.

The barangays of Pagburnayan, Paoa, and Tamag are on the area of rolling plains. On the other hand, portions of Barangays Tamag and the barangays of Bulala and Salindeg are found on the city's hilly parts.

Its most dominant hill feature is the Vigan Gap Hill in the eastern part, just 10 kilometers away from the city. Vigan used to be separated from the rest of the mainland by the rivers of Abra, Mestizo and Govantes, making it an island during that time. The Govantes River cuts the current Vigan plain from North to South.

The large Abra and Mestizo rivers, together with the rivers of Bantay, Bantaoay, Nauman and Santo Tomas serve as part of a network that drain the Vigan plains. These rivers are not only important in safekeeping the city from floods, they also served as important ways of transport for trade-related activities from the 15th century to the 19th century, that helped make Vigan a thriving center. The most vital of these rivers is said to be the Mestizo River which was used by the small vessels to transport goods and people.

There is a faulting trend in the Vigan plain that ends in Santa Catalina.

Soil type
The land area of Vigan is generally flat. Slopes of 20 are found at Barangay V, Tamag, and Paoa. There are no forest reserves in the city in terms of potential and raw materials. Bamboo is the only forest product in Vigan.

There are five soil types in the city. First, the Bantay Loam, located at the southern portion of Raois, has a land area of 36.67 hectares, and is good as pastureland. The second, Umingan sandy, with a land area of 1191.57 hectares, is good for upland rice and vegetables. The third, San Manuel clay loam, which is best for bananas, cotton and vegetables, has an area of 1244.57 hectares. The fourth, Bantog clay—considered as the most significant type for soil, and the best clay material for making pots, jars and all earthenware, has a land area of 31.65 hectares. The fifth, beach sand, with a land area of 7.28 hectares, is generally found on the shores of all the beaches of Vigan, and is best for coconut plantation.

Barangays

Vigan is politically subdivided into 39 barangays. These barangays are headed by elected officials: Barangay Captain, Barangay Council, whose members are called Barangay Councilors. All are elected every three years.

Geologic base and mineral resources
The sedimentary and metamorphic rocks that are present in the city are alluvium, fluviatile, lacustrine, paludal and beach deposits such as coral, stools, and beach rock. These are predominantly found along the coastal areas of Vigan. An important non-metallic mineral resource found in Vigan is the kind of clay that is used in making earthen jars locally called burnay. Earthenware of different uses and sizes are made of this kind of clay. Known as Bantog clay, the mineral is the basic material in making bricks. These bricks are the original materials in building the  Hispanic houses of Vigan.

Physiography
Vigan is situated in a Quaternary Age sedimentary plain called the Vigan-Bantay Plain which is part of the Ilocos coastal plain. The Vigan-Bantay Plain is bounded on the east by a moderately rugged Miocene sediments consisting of interbedded sandstones and shale to very rugged Meta-volcanics and Meta sediment topography; on the south is the Municipality of Santa where the north–south trending fault terminates; to the west is the South China Sea; while the northern boundary opens to the northern extension of the Ilocos coastal plain.

The central part of the plain is characterized by a dissected ridge of Plio-Pleistocene age that trends in a northeast–southwest direction. The ridge divides the Vigan-Bantay Plain into northern and southern plains.

The northern part of the plain is drained by minor rivers namely: Bantaoay, Santo Tomas, and Nauman rivers, while the Abra River is the main drainage network of the southern portion of the plain. The Abra River meanders into the hinterland but exhibits a braided pattern across the plain.

The drainage network of the eastern margin of Vigan-Bantay plain consist of deeply cut valleys whose pattern is strongly controlled by main faulting trends, particularly those in the northerly and easterly directions.

Vigan is being drained by the Vigan River and Bantay River, respectively, on the north and on the south by Mestizo River whose water discharge comes from the Bantaoay head waters.

The relief of the Vigan-Bantay plain is actively level to undulating with a slope ranging from 0% to 8%. Vigan in particular is generally in level with several hills in Barangays Tamag, Bulala, and Salindeg, sometimes reaching about 50 meters in elevation and has a slope ranging from 3% to 8%.

The eastern margin of the plain characterized by a steep to very steep slope, about 40% to 60%, the relief often reaches an elevation of more than 600 meters especially the northerly and easterly portion.

The dominant topographic feature in the eastern margin of the town is the Vigan Gap Hill where the continuously shifting Vigan River cuts its way. The Gap Hill is located approximately 10 kilometers east of Vigan.

Weather and climate

The city of Vigan falls under (tropical savanna), which is characterized by two pronounced seasons – the dry season which starts from the month of November and ends in April; and the wet season which spans the months of May to October.

The average temperature is 26 °C. The average warmest temperature is 30.9 °C and the average coldest temperature is 21.1 °C. An average of 7-10 typhoons visit Vigan annually. The average relative humidity is 81%.

Demographics

In the 2020 census, Vigan had a population of 53,935.

Economy

Government

Vigan, belonging to the first congressional district of the province of Ilocos Sur, is governed by a mayor designated as its local chief executive and by a city council as its legislative body in accordance with the Local Government Code. The mayor, vice mayor, and the councilors are elected directly by the people through an election which is being held every three years.

Elected officials

Architecture

When Juan de Salcedo founded Vigan in 1572, he decided to pattern its urban plan with that of Intramuros, the walled city in Manila.

The urban planners of the Spanish government also followed a basic pattern that can be observed in most old towns in the country, whose establishment dates back to the Spanish colonial period. This pattern is detailed in the Ley de las Indias, the Law of the Indies, and was put into force in the 18th century. Under the Law of the Indies streets were to follow a grid pattern, the center of which being a plaza or central park.

In Vigan, the central park is the Plaza Salcedo. Next to it are the administrative buildings—the Casa Real or provincial administrative office, and the municipio (municipal hall). A stone's throw away are the religious buildings—the seminary of the archdiocese, the Arzobispado (Archbishop's Palace), and the St. Paul's Cathedral. Beside these religious structures is the church-run school, the Saint Paul College, known in its early days as the Colegio de Niñas. After the full transfer of the said school to the neighboring towns of Bantay and San Vicente, the building was handed over to the Archdiocese of Nueva Segovia and is currently being occupied by a retail store chain, with only a commemorative plaque at the building's entrance and the old "ROSARY COLLEGE" concrete sign at its rear reminding visitors of its past (the school's old logo, once found at the building's facade, has been removed sometime later).

A unique thing is the existence of another plaza, the Plaza Burgos, which is immediately beside the St. Paul's Cathedral. After the first tier emanating from Plaza Salcedo are the houses of prominent residents that now make up the preserved heritage houses of Vigan. This urban plan remained relatively intact despite wars and natural calamities that have been endured by Vigan since its foundation.

The major changes to the original urban landscape were caused by fires. The Casa Real was replaced with a provincial capitol building during the American period when the original structure burned down. The archdiocese seminary was also destroyed by fire in 1968, and it lay in ruins until the late 1990s, when part of a shopping mall was built on the site.

The residential areas were not spared. Some of the houses on Crisologo Street were casualties of fire during the Japanese period; several houses on Quezon Avenue were destroyed by fire as well in 1952; while in 1971, some houses near Plaza Burgos burned down as well. The houses along Crisologo Street that were burned were later reconstructed faithfully following the architecture of the former structures.

Presently, there are other major areas of activities other than the two plazas, though these are still where most recreation and shopping are done. One may also go to the southern part of the city to reach the commercial area and public market. The current Public Market is a new one, as the old one (formerly the Imelda Socio-Commercial Complex), on the same site, was (also) destroyed by fire. A new mall (opened in December 2017) has risen from the site of the city's first Public Market, found in the center of the business district, after being the site of some business establishments and a tricycle-for-hire terminal.

Tourism

Popular sites include Calle Crisologo located in the Mestizo district- the old quarters of the city. Syquia Mansion Museum, Plaza Salcedo's Dancing Fountain, Padre Burgos House, and the National Museum of the Philippines. Nearby is the Bantay Church Bell Tower.  Of special note is the Hotel Luna, which houses an extensive collection of art, including La Mandolinera by Jose Luna. Centuries-old Sta. Maria Church, designated also as a UNESCO World Heritage Site.

Transportation

Metro transport
Modes of transport within the city are purely land-based. Vehicles for public use include jeepneys, tricycles, vans-for-hire (or PUVs/public utility vehicles) and calesas (horse-drawn vehicles). Buses, mini-buses and jeepneys provide transportation to and from Vigan. The metro Vigan transport system is mostly served by tricycles, which are color- and number-coded to identify their municipality of origin.

Land transportation
Vigan City is well-served by a network of roads and a major highway that connects to Manila North Road, the highway leading to Manila and the rest of the country. Major bus companies such as Dominion Bus Lines, Viron Transit, Partas, and Aniceto/St. Joseph operate terminals in Vigan. GMW Florida Transport operates a terminal in Bantay, just outside Vigan. Bus companies such as Maria de Leon and Fariñas pass by Vigan on their way to Laoag. They operate direct and/or indirect bus services from Vigan City to points in Luzon, mostly to Manila, Baguio, and Laoag and vice versa.  There are also independent bus operators plying the Laoag-Vigan-Carmen and Vigan-Abra routes, and have a joint terminal found at the New Vigan Public Market Annex.  A taxi service started operating in 2019, just before the COViD-19 pandemic struck.

Air transportation
A secondary airport called Vigan Airport (also known as Mindoro Airport) is located at Barangay Mindoro. It has one asphalted runway, 900 meters long and 30 meters wide. The airport was once a dormant asset of the city for it does not generate revenue, with only chartered and private planes using it; it is currently being upgraded and is on its way toward commercialization.

Education
University of Northern Philippines Main Campus — in Barangay Tamag. It is the oldest state university in Northern Luzon, founded by virtue of Republic Act 4449, authored by Congressman Floro Crisologo.
Divine Word College of Vigan (formerly known as the Colegio de la Inmaculada Concepción) — the second oldest privately funded school in Ilocos Sur, founded by priests belonging to the Society of the Divine Word (SVD).
 Macro Colleges Inc. — the first computer college in the province, having evolved from being the first shop in Ilocos Sur to offer computer-based services. The school is now K-to-12 College, located at Quezon Avenue.  Currently operated by the Nueva Segovia Consortium of Cooperatives.
Ilocos Sur National High School (ISNHS) — the major national high school in the province.
Lyceum de Ylocos — is a new school offering Technical-Vocational courses and is a registered Senior High School offering various Tracks that include ABM, GAS, HUMSS and TLE-Technical-Vocational Courses. Situated at the heart of the Heritage City, 3F Vigan Landmark Building, Barangay VIII. The school adopted a classical name to emphasize the grandeur of its location, the Heritage City of Vigan, the only awardee of the title New World Wonder City in the Philippines. It fosters the promotion of tourism and hospitality; promotes preservation of the cultural heritage and innovates towards service delivery and business processing. Lyceum de Ylocos is committed to be of service to students through the provisions of an environment where there would be opportunities to relate theories and knowledge to practical training.
Data Center Colleges Philippines Vigan Branch - Data Center Philippines (DCPI) first came to Ilocos Sur through a partnership with the University of Northern Philippines for its computerization efforts in the late 80s.  It later evolved independently as a college offering computer- and non-computer-related courses.  Formerly operating where Lyceum de Ylocos is operating today, they are currently located in a building just outside UNP's Vigan Campus.

Media

TV Stations
PTV Vigan Channel 4
GNN Vigan Channel 30
TV5 Vigan Channel 32
UNTV Vigan Channel 36
Sonshine TV Vigan Channel 38
GTV Vigan Channel 40
One Sports Vigan Channel 46
GMA Vigan Channel 48

Cable & Satellite
Eaglevision Cable
Vigan Satellite Cable TV
Cignal TV
Sky Direct

Radio
AM Stations:
DZVV Bombo Radyo 603 (Bombo Radyo Philippines)
DWAE Radyo Pilipinas 747 (Philippine Broadcasting Service)
Radyo Commando 927 (Solidnorth Broadcasting)
DZNS 963 Radyo Totoo (Catholic Media Network)

FM Stations:
91.7 Brigada News FM (Brigada Mass Media Corporation)
93.3 Love Radio (Manila Broadcasting Company)
94.1 Magik FM (Century Broadcasting Network)
98.9 XFM Vigan (Southern Broadcasting Network/Yes2Health, Advertising, Inc.)
99.7 Core FM (Iddes Broadcast Group)
100.5 Campus Radio (University of Northern Philippines)

Sister cities

References

External links

Vigan.ph
 
 [ Philippine Standard Geographic Code]
Philippine Census Information
Local Governance Performance Management System

 
Cities in Ilocos Sur
Populated places established in 1572
1572 establishments in the Philippines
Provincial capitals of the Philippines
Architecture in the Philippines
World Heritage Sites in the Philippines
Populated coastal places in the Philippines
Spanish colonial infrastructure in the Philippines
Component cities in the Philippines